Thomas Cook Airlines Limited was a British charter and scheduled airline headquartered in Manchester, England. It was founded in 2007 from the merger of Thomas Cook Group and MyTravel Group, and was part of the Thomas Cook Group Airlines. It served leisure destinations worldwide from its main bases at Manchester Airport and Gatwick Airport on a scheduled and charter basis. It also operated services from eight other bases around the United Kingdom. Thomas Cook Group and all UK entities including Thomas Cook Airlines entered compulsory liquidation on 23 September 2019.

History

The airline was created on 1 September 1999 as JMC Air Limited through the merger of Flying Colours Airlines and Caledonian Airways. following the purchase of Thomas Cook & Son by the Carlson Leisure Group. It started operations on 27 March 2000, operating flights from 6 bases in the UK, offering seat-only bookings and bookings via Thomas Cook Tour Operations. In 2001, the airline became the first UK operator of the stretched Boeing 757-300. In April 2003, Thomas Cook AG rebranded its airlines under the Thomas Cook name brand.

In June 2007, following the merger between Thomas Cook AG and MyTravel Group to form Thomas Cook Group, on 30 March 2008, MyTravel Airways was merged with Thomas Cook Airlines.

In 2013, Thomas Cook Airlines, Thomas Cook Airlines Belgium, Thomas Cook Airlines Scandinavia and Condor merged into a single operating segment of a group named the Thomas Cook Group Airlines. Thomas Cook Airlines carried around 6.4 million passengers during 2015, a six percent increase compared with 2014.

Collapse

The airline fell into liquidation on 23 September 2019. Airlines around the world took part in ferrying stranded passengers back to the UK, using their aircraft. The repatriation effort covered 165,000 passengers, the largest in UK history, and 65,000 more passengers than the collapse of Monarch Airlines in 2017. The last flight to depart was MT2643, Registration G-MLJL (Airbus A330-243)  from Orlando to Manchester. The airline's AOC was revoked on 7 November 2019.

Corporate affairs

Overview
Thomas Cook Airlines was part of the airline division of the Thomas Cook Group, which consisted of three more sister airlines, all of which had a joint fleet management: Thomas Cook Airlines Scandinavia, German-based Condor and Thomas Cook Airlines Balearics. The airline held a United Kingdom Civil Aviation Authority Type A Operating Licence, permitting it to carry passengers, cargo and mail on aircraft with 20 or more seats.

Profits

Business figures

Destinations

Fleet

Final active fleet
At the time of closure, the Thomas Cook Airlines fleet consisted of the following aircraft:

Historical fleet
As JMC Air, the airline has previously operated the following aircraft:

Callsigns
The airline has used a number of callsigns:

Cabin

Long haul
Premium economy

Thomas Cook offered 'Premium Class' on most long-haul flights on board their Airbus A330 aircraft. The cabin offered extra legroom, wider seats with more recline, personal entertainment, complimentary hot meal and drinks.

Economy
Thomas Cook's long-haul 'Economy Class' was offered on all Airbus A330 aircraft. It offered a standard 31-inch of seat-pitch , seat-back entertainment, and complimentary hot meal. Drinks and additional snacks were available to purchase.

Short and medium haul
Economy
Thomas Cook's short and medium-haul economy cabin on their fleet of A321 aircraft offered a standard seat-pitch of between 28-30-inch at 6-abreast. Drinks and snacks were available to purchase on board or to pre-order and inflight entertainment was available.

In 2017, the company introduced Economy PLUS, an upgraded economy class package on short and medium-haul flights. This package included a priority security lane and check-in, an additional 4 kg of hand luggage, inflight drinks and food, access to in-flight entertainment and an option to reserve their seat.

See also
List of defunct airlines of the United Kingdom

References

External links

Defunct airlines of the United Kingdom
Airlines established in 1999
Airlines disestablished in 2019
Defunct charter airlines of the United Kingdom
British Air Transport Association
Companies based in Manchester